The Galveston Railroad  is a Class III terminal switching railroad headquartered in Galveston, Texas. It primarily serves the transportation of cargo to and from the Port of Galveston.

GVSR operates  of yard track at Galveston, over a  facility.

The railroad was formed in 1900 as the Galveston Wharves Railway. It is owned by the City of Galveston, and GVSR took over operations in 1987.

On May 26, 2005, Genesee & Wyoming (G&W) announced that it has agreed to purchase the railroad operations of Rail Management Corporation (RMC), the parent company of Galveston Railroad. G&W paid $243 million in cash and assume $1.7 million in company debt to gain control of 14 short line railroads from RMC across the southeastern United States, as of June 1, 2005.

References

External links

 Link to Union Pacific website with GVSR Details
 Galveston Railroad official webpage - Genesee and Wyoming website

Companies based in Galveston, Texas
Genesee & Wyoming
Texas railroads